The 2020 season was the 13th season for the IPL cricket franchise Royal Challengers Bangalore. They were one of the eight teams to compete in the tournament.

On 14 February RCB revealed their new logo for the team which features a lion. On 2 November 2020, they qualified for the playoffs for the first time since 2016. However, they lost against Sunrisers Hyderabad in the Eliminator, finishing the tournament in 4th place.

Background

Player retention and transfers 

The Royal Challengers Bangalore retained 13 players and released eleven players. On 31 August 2020, Royal Challengers signed Adam Zampa to replace Kane Richardson.

Retained players: Virat Kohli, Moeen Ali, Yuzvendra Chahal, Parthiv Patel, Mohammed Siraj, Umesh Yadav, Pawan Negi, Devdutt Padikkal, Gurkeerat Singh Mann, Washington Sundar, Shivam Dube, Navdeep Saini, AB de Villiers.

Released players: Marcus Stoinis, Shimron Hetmyer, Akshdeep Nath, Nathan Coulter-Nile, Colin de Grandhomme, Prayas Ray Barman, Tim Southee, Kulwant Khejroliya, Himmat Singh, Heinrich Klaasen, Milind Kumar.

Auction

RCB went in the auction with a purse of 27.90 Cr INR. RCB, the group that had a minimal number of players before the closeout purchased 8 additional players to take their count to 21 players; the least among every one of the groups. Their technique looked very perplexing despite the fact that they got some large names like Aaron Finch, Chris Morris, Dale Steyn, and Kane Richardson.

Players bought: Aaron Finch, Chris Morris, Shahbaz Ahmed, Pawan Deshpande, Joshua Philippe, Isuru Udana, Dale Steyn, Kane Richardson and Adam Zampa

Team Analysis
ESPNcricinfo wrote "Like Delhi Capitals, the team of Royal Challengers Bangalore could not find their favorite players on many occasions during the auction. This was the reason that he too had to move towards the second or third options. Captain Virat Kohli certainly has more bowling options this time, If the team lands with two foreign fast bowlers, then they will have to find an Indian option at the opening. If it is not, then the Indian player will be seen in fast bowling. Finding the right combination at the beginning of the tournament will be the key to RCB's win."

Indian Premier League
On 21 September, the Royal Challengers Banglore started their season campaign defeating Sunrisers Hyderabad by 10 runs. Virat Kohli lost the toss & was put to bat. Devdutt Padikkal ( 56) built the 90-run partnership with Aaron Finch (29) for the first wicket. Banglore scored 163-run in 20 overs. Banglore were able to restrict the Sunrisers to 153.

On 24 September, Royal Challengers lost their first match of the season from Kings XI Punjab by 97-run. Virat Kohli won the toss and elected to field. KL Rahul and Mayank Agarwal build the Kings XI innings with a 57-run stand for the first wicket. Rahul scored 132 off 69 balls with 14 fours and 7 sixes and helped the Kings XI finish the innings at 206/3 in 20 overs. Chasing a target of 207, the Royal Challengers had lost three wickets in the first four overs. Kings XI new ball pair of Sheldon Cottrell and Mohammed Shami continued their good work from the first match and Royal Challengers were eventually bowled out for 109. Rahul became the fastest Indian batsman to complete 2000 runs in IPL.

On 28 September, Royal Challengers won their second match against Mumbai Indians in a super over. Kohli lost the toss and was put to bat. Devdutt Padikkal and Aaron Finch built an 81-run partnership for the first wicket and after that, Kohli scored 3-run off 11 balls, in the last 7 overs Royal Challengers scored 105-run, helped the Royal Challengers finish the innings at 201/3 in 20 overs. Chasing a target of 202, the Mumbai Had had lost two wickets in a first two overs, but Ishan Kishan 99 off 58 balls brilliant inning and their 119-run partnership with Kieron Pollard to power their team finish the innings at 201/5 in 20 overs. In a super over Mumbai could manage only 7-run.

They defeated their arch-rivals Chennai Super Kings by 37 runs and Kolkata Knight Riders by 82 runs. The defeat margin was the same when Kolkata Knight Riders beat Royal Challengers Bangalore in 2017 by bowling them out for the lowest IPL score of 49. On their next faceoff, they thrashed Kolkata Knight Riders forcing them to score just 84/8. Royal Challengers Bangalore later on chased the score in 13.3 overs thereby winning by 8 wickets.

They also defeated Rajasthan Royals in both matches they played against them. RCB this season has lost only 4 matches being defeated 2 times against the Kings XI Punjab and 2 matches against the Delhi Capitals. After defeating KKR, Bangalore lost matches against table toppers Mumbai Indians and Sunrisers Hyderabad and their last match was against Delhi Capitals. They lost the match but made it to the playoffs owing to their good run rate. They played the eliminator against Sunrisers Hyderabad in which Hyderabad won the toss and elected to field first. Bangalore batted first and scored 131 for 7 in 20 overs. Hyderabad completed the chase with 2 balls to spare which denied Bangalore to win their first ever title.

Offseason
The new logo for RCB and the new jersey of the team was released on 14 February 2020. AB de Villiers, captain Virat Kohli, and spinner Yuzvendra Chahal were seen in the new jersey. The new logo had a gold-colored lion with the traditional RCB red used around it.

On 13 March, the BCCI postponed the tournament until 15 April, in view of the ongoing coronavirus pandemic. On 14 April, India's Prime Minister Narendra Modi said that the lockdown in India would last until at least 3 May, with the tournament postponed further. The following day, the BCCI suspended the tournament indefinitely. The nation-wide restrictions on sports events were relaxed on 17 May, allowing events to take place behind closed doors. On 24 May, India's sports minister Kiren Rijiju stated that the decision on whether or not to allow the tournament to be conducted that year would be made by the union government based on "the situation of the pandemic". In June, the BCCI confirmed that their preference was to host the tournament in India, possibly between September and October, and on 24 July, confirmed 19 September as the start.

Pre-season
On 17 September, it was announced that RCB team will play first match in the UAE, with 'My Covid Heroes' written on the back of the all players' jersey in honor of the Corona heroes.

Squad
 Players with international caps are listed in bold.

Administration and support staff

Kit manufacturers and sponsors

|

Teams and standings
 Results by match 

League table

League stage

Playoffs

Eliminator

Statistics

Most runs

 Source: Cricinfo

Most wickets

 Source: 'Cricinfo

Player of the match awards

References

2020s in Bangalore
2020 Indian Premier League
Royal Challengers Bangalore seasons